The town of Saffron Walden once had a railway station. It opened in 1865, and closed in 1964.

Today 
The station yard has been developed for housing, with the station building being retained and converted into private dwellings.

Since the station's closure, the nearest station to Saffron Walden is Audley End.

Route

References

External links
 Saffron Walden station on navigable 1946 O. S. map

Former Great Eastern Railway stations
Railway stations in Great Britain opened in 1865
Railway stations in Great Britain closed in 1964
Disused railway stations in Essex
Beeching closures in England